The 78th Group Army, is a military formation of the Chinese People's Liberation Army Ground Forces (PLAGF). The 78th Group Army is one of twelve total group armies of the PLAGF, the largest echelon of ground forces in the People's Republic of China, and one of three assigned to the nation's Northern Theater Command.

History
The origins of this army go back to Nanchang Uprising. After People's Republic of China was established, it belonged to the 62nd Group Army for a while.

On February 19, 1949, column 1 of the Shanxi-Hebei-Shandong-Henan Military Region in Henan Shenqiu area became the 16th Army of the People's Liberation Army, was placed under the 5th Corps of the PLA Second Field Army. Yin Xianbing (尹先炳) was appointed army commander.

Organization 
It was composed of the 69th, 46th, 48th, and 4th Armored Divisions, the 68th brigade and an artillery brigade.

In 2006 the formation consisted of the:
Headquarters, Changchun, Jilin
46th Motorized Infantry Division, Changchun, Jilin
48th Motorized Infantry Brigade, Tonghua, Jilin
4th Armored Division, Meihekou, Jilin
Artillery Brigade, Yantian, Jilin
AA Brigade, Changchun, Jilin
(Source Blasko 2006, 76)

In 2013, the formation consisted of the:
Headquarters, Changchun, Jilin
46th Motorized Infantry Division (the Red Army Division), Changchun, Jilin
69th Motorized Infantry Division, Harbin, Heilongjiang
48th Motorized Infantry Brigade, Tonghua, Jilin
68th Motorized Infantry Brigade (People's Republic of China), Qiqihar, Heilongjiang
4th Armored Division, Meihekou, Jilin
Artillery Brigade, Yanbian, Jilin
AA Brigade, Changchun, Jilin
Note Blasko 2013, lists the 4th Armored Division as a division, not as a brigade.

(Source Blasko, Tradition and Transformation of the PLA, 2013, 89)

In 2017, the formation consisted of the:
Headquarters, Harbin, Heilongjiang
8th Heavy Combined Arms Brigade
48th Light Combined Arms Brigade
68th Heavy Combined Arms Brigade
115th Medium Combined Arms Brigade
202nd Heavy Combined Arms Brigade
204th Heavy Combined Arms Brigade
78th Special Operation Brigade (formerly the 67th Brigade)
78th Army Aviation Brigade
78th Artillery Brigade
78th Air-Defense Brigade
78th Chemical Engineering Brigade
78th Sustainment Brigade

Notable members
General Xu Caihou, former vice-chairman of the Central Military Commission (CMC) who was detained as part of a high-profile anti-corruption campaign, was a former member of the 78th Group Army.

References 

Field armies of the People's Liberation Army
Northern Theater Command
Shenyang Military Region
Military units and formations established in 2017